Claude Valentine Craigie was a Scottish amateur footballer who played in the Scottish League for Queen's Park as a wing half and full back.

Personal life 
Craigie served as a bombardier in the Royal Garrison Artillery during the First World War.

References

1886 births
Scottish footballers
Scottish Football League players
British Army personnel of World War I
People from Montrose, Angus
Association football wing halves
Queen's Park F.C. players
Date of death missing
Royal Garrison Artillery soldiers
Association football fullbacks
Footballers from Angus, Scotland

Military personnel from Angus, Scotland